Ratas, ratones, rateros (Spanish: "Rats, Mice, Petty Thieves") is a 1999 Ecuadorian film directed by Sebastián Cordero and starring Carlos Valencia and Marco Bustos. It was shown at the 1999 Bogotá Film Festival but did not receive a wide release until 2001. It was nominated for Best Film of the Year in 2001 by the Spanish Goya Awards. It was described as the first Ecuadorian film with international-standard production values.

The plot follows the life of Salvador (Bustos), a young petty thief from Quito, after he is visited by his cousin Ángel (Valencia), an ex-convict with a bounty on his head.

Cast
Simón Brauer as J.C.
Marco Bustos as Salvador
Cristina Dávila as Mayra
Fabricio Lalama as Marlon
Irina López as Carolina
Antonio Negret as Martin
Carlos Valencia as Angel

See also
Cinema of Ecuador

References

External links

1999 films
1990s crime drama films
Ecuadorian drama films
1990s Spanish-language films
Films directed by Sebastián Cordero
1999 drama films